The Manshū MT-1 Hayabusa (Japanese: 隼, "Peregrine Falcon") was an airliner produced by the Japanese Manchuria Airplane Manufacturing Company in Manchukuo in the late 1930s. It was a conventional, low-wing cantilever monoplane with fixed tailwheel undercarriage. The flight deck was fully enclosed and separate from the passenger cabin, which could seat six people. The type equipped Manchukuo National Airways.

Specifications (Production aircraft)

See also

References
Notes

Bibliography

External links
Mansyu MT-1 Hayabusa ~ A Falcon of Different Feather

1930s Japanese airliners
Mansyū aircraft
Single-engined tractor aircraft
Low-wing aircraft
Aircraft first flown in 1937